Day Star 87 is an Indian reserve of the Day Star First Nation in Saskatchewan. It is 87 kilometres northwest of Fort Qu'Appelle. In the 2016 Canadian Census, it recorded a population of 148 living in 42 of its 62 total private dwellings. In the same year, its Community Well-Being index was calculated at 65 of 100, compared to 58.4 for the average First Nations community and 77.5 for the average non-Indigenous community.

References

Indian reserves in Saskatchewan
Division No. 10, Saskatchewan
Day Star First Nation